Chande is a village  located in Amritsar district in Punjab. It has a population of 914 people, with 488 males and 426 females. The PIN code of this village is 143601.

References

Villages in Amritsar district